Mameri is a surname. Notable people with the surname include:

Abdelkrim Mameri (born 1981), Algerian footballer
Daniel Mameri (born 1972), Brazilian water polo player
Margaux Mameri (born 1997), French ice hockey player

See also
Maneri